Yaroslav Olehovych Sydorenko (born 27 August 1998) is a Ukrainian professional footballer who plays as a right midfielder for Ukrainian club Alians Lypova Dolyna.

References

External links
 Profile on Alians Lypova Dolyna official website
 
 

1998 births
Living people
Sportspeople from Sumy
Ukrainian footballers
Association football midfielders
FC Barsa Sumy players
FC Alians Lypova Dolyna players
Ukrainian First League players
Ukrainian Second League players
Ukrainian Amateur Football Championship players